Rosh Pina (ראש פינה) is a lay-led independent minyan in Washington, D.C. It meets for Shabbat morning services twice a month in the National Museum of American Jewish Military History (NMAJMH). It also meets occasionally for Friday night and holiday services, in addition to organizing social and educational events such as shabbatonim and parties to celebrate Hanukkah, Purim and other Jewish holidays.

Overview
Rosh Pina's website describes it as "a dati community built around a common commitment to halakha, tefillah, and equality. It was founded in 2007 as a partnership minyan in order to provide a Religious environment that was more inclusive of women's participation than traditional Orthodox synagogues.

Services and liturgy
The congregation combines a traditional liturgy with certain prayer leadership opportunities for women, including Kabbalat Shabbat on Friday nights, Pesukei DeZimra, removing and replacing the Torah in the Ark, and reading from and being called up to the Torah on Saturday mornings. A mechitza separating men and women runs down the middle of the room. Its practices are similar to those of Shira Hadasha  in Jerusalem and Darkhei Noam  in New York City.

Halakhic basis
The practices of Rosh Pina and communities like it are based on an opinion by Modern Orthodox Rabbi Mendel Shapiro, who holds B.A. and M.S. degrees from Yeshiva University and a J.D. from Columbia University, received his smikhah (rabbinic ordination) from Yeshiva University, and now practices law in Jerusalem.  In his Halakhic (Jewish law) analysis, entitled "Qeri’at ha-Torah by Women: A Halakhic Analysis," he calls upon those times throughout our history when women have received aliyot to (have been called up to) and have read from the Torah in communal services with men and women present, and carefully examines the circumstances in which this took place.  His position and conclusions have subsequently been supported and expanded upon by Rabbi Dr Daniel Sperber (Professor of Talmud at Bar-Ilan University in his article entitled "Congregational Dignity and Human Dignity: Women and Public Torah Reading."  He, too, delves into specific cases when Jewish law permitted and sometimes even required women to be called to and read from the Torah on Shabbat in services with men present. Like Shapiro, Sperber is not known a Posek (decider of Jewish law) and this particular position of both of them is a minority view.

Rabbi Gil Student has weighed in against the practice, as have rabbis Aryeh and Dov Frimer, who wrote that "these practices are a radical break from the ritual of millennia and have not received the approval of any major posek."

See also
 Jewish Orthodox Feminist Alliance
 Jewish feminism
 Role of women in Judaism

Footnotes

External links
Rosh Pina website
Darkhei Noam website
Shira Hadasha website
JOFA partnership minyanim (with minyan links list)
JOFA Mixed Torah Reading Articles

Further reading
 Jacqueline L. Salmon, "Synthesis Outside the Synagogue", Washington Post, April 29, 2009.
Sperber, Daniel. Women and Men in Communal Prayer: Halakhic Perspectives. KTAV Publishing House, 2010. 
Ross, Tamar. Expanding the Palace of Torah: Orthodoxy and Feminism. Brandeis University Press, 2004, pp. 97–98; 179-183. 
 Tova Hartman, Feminism Encounters Traditional Judaism: Resistance and Accommodation. Brandeis University Press, 2007. .

Judaism and women
Modern Orthodox synagogues in the United States
Independent minyanim
2007 establishments in Washington, D.C.
Jewish organizations established in 2007